Statistics of North American Soccer League in season 1972. This was the 5th season of the NASL.

Overview
Eight teams took part in the league with the New York Cosmos winning the championship.

Changes from previous season

Rules changes
The league changed its offside rule during the season on June 26. They created a "Blue Line" which was an offside line across the field, 35 yards from the goal line. Thereafter, no player could be offside unless he had crossed the 35-yard line. This made the NASL unique in the soccer world; the league received temporary approval for the change from FIFA on an experimental basis only. The league also switched the playoff format to single-match elimination contests rather than series.

New teams
None

Teams folding
None

Teams moving
Washington Darts to Miami Gatos

Name changes
None

Regular season
W = Wins, L = Losses, T= Ties, GF = Goals For, GA = Goals Against, PT= point system

6 points for a win,
3 points for a tie,
0 points for a loss,
1 point for each goal scored up to three per game.
-Premiers (most points). -Other playoff teams.

NASL All-Stars

Playoffs
All playoff games in all rounds including the NASL Final were single game elimination match ups.

Bracket

Semifinals

NASL Final 1972

1972 NASL Champions: New York Cosmos

Post season awards
Most Valuable Player: Randy Horton, New York
Coach of the year: Casey Frankiewicz, St. Louis
Rookie of the year: Mike Winter, St. Louis

References

External links
Complete Results and Standings

 
North American Soccer League (1968–1984) seasons
1972
1972 in Canadian soccer